Thatcher ministry may refer to:

 First Thatcher ministry, the British majority government led by Margaret Thatcher from 1979 to 1983
 Second Thatcher ministry, the British majority government led by Margaret Thatcher from 1983 to 1987
 Third Thatcher ministry, the British majority government led by Margaret Thatcher from 1987 to 1990

See also
 List of ministers under Margaret Thatcher
 Premiership of Margaret Thatcher
 Shadow Cabinet of Margaret Thatcher